Oleg Ishchenko (born January 22, 1994) is a French rugby union footballer, who currently plays for Provence Rugby in the Rugby Pro D2. His usual position is at prop.

Biography 
Oleg Ishchenko begins the rugby on the 2nd year of the middle school, in UNSS to the middle school of Ottmarsheim, then integrates the school of rugby of the club of l'AS Chalampé.

In 2010, during the tournament of Toulon of January, he is classified in the national top 100. A few days later, he carries the jersey of the French team in junior category, on occasion of the tournament interpoles of Toulouse.

In September, 2012, it is called to enter the division of France. He plays then under the shirt of the France national under-20 rugby union team, in this way competing for the World Rugby Under 20 Championship which he finishes in the 5th place.

Personal life
Ishchenko is of Belarusian descent.

References

External links
Oleg Ishchenko on itsrugby.co.uk.
Oleg Ishchenko on espn.co.uk.

Montpellier Hérault Rugby players
French rugby union players
French people of Belarusian descent
Rugby union props
Rugby Club Vannes players
1994 births
Living people